The Last Round: Chuvalo vs. Ali is a Canadian documentary film, directed by Joseph Blasioli and released in 2003. The film centres on the 1966 boxing match at Maple Leaf Gardens between Canadian boxer George Chuvalo and world champion Muhammad Ali.

An excerpt from the film was screened at the SkyDome before a Toronto Argonauts game on October 20, 2002, with both Chuvalo and Ali in attendance. The full film premiered on May 3, 2003 at the Hot Docs Canadian International Documentary Festival, where Blasioli won a special jury award from the Best Canadian Documentary jury.

The film was a Genie Award nominee for Best Feature Length Documentary at the 24th Genie Awards in 2004. It was subsequently broadcast by CBC Television on August 30, 2004.

References

External links
 

2003 films
2003 documentary films
Canadian sports documentary films
Canadian boxing films
Documentary films about boxing
National Film Board of Canada documentaries
2000s English-language films
2000s Canadian films